K Venkataswami Naidu (6 July 1896 – 8 March 1972) was an Indian lawyer and politician from the Tamil Nadu, belonging to Indian National Congress. He served as the Mayor of Madras in the late 1930s. During 1952-54, he was the Minister for Religious endowments and Registration of Madras State(in C. Rajagopalachari's cabinet).

Early life 

Born on 6 July 1896 to Bashyam Naidu [Founder of Appa & Co Pharmaceuticals], Venkataswamy Naidu is a direct descendant of Beri Thimmappa, a popular late 17th and early 18th century merchant and dubash. Venkataswamy Naidu was educated at the Pachaiyappa's College and studied law at the Madras Law College. Their Family represents a powerful Naidu Family & were one of the wealthiest families in Madras.

In 1916, Venkataswamy Naidu married Varalakshmi Bhimamma. He sacrificed his entire life for the welfare of the people.

References

Tamil Nadu ministers
Mayors of Chennai
1896 births
1972 deaths
Indian National Congress politicians from Tamil Nadu
University of Madras alumni
Madras MLAs 1952–1957